Big-footed mice (Macrotarsomys) are a genus of rodent in the family Nesomyidae. 
It contains the following species:

Genus Macrotarsomys - Big-footed mice 
Bastard big-footed mouse, Macrotarsomys bastardi Milne-Edwards and G. Grandidier, 1898
Greater big-footed mouse, Macrotarsomys ingens Petter, 1959
Petter's big-footed mouse, Macrotarsomys petteri Goodman and Soarimalala, 2005

References

Macrotarsomys
Rodent genera
Taxa named by Alfred Grandidier
Taxonomy articles created by Polbot